Ratilal is a given name. Notable people with the name include:

Ratilal Borisagar (born 1938), Gujarati humourist, essayist, and editor
Ratilal Chandaria (1922–2013), Indian industrialist and philanthropist
Ratilal Kalidas Varma (born 1948), Indian politician